Krittkanan Phansamdaeng (born ) (former name Kittiyakorn Phansamdaeng) is a Thai female volleyball player. She was part of the Thailand women's national volleyball team. On club level she played for RBAC in 2009.

Clubs
  Idea Khonkaen (2009–2017)
  Nakhon Ratchasima (2017–present)

Awards

Individuals 
 2010 Thailand League "Best Setter"

Clubs
 2012–13 Thailand League -  Champion, with Idea Khonkaen
 2017–18 Thailand League -  Runner-Up, with Nakhon Ratchasima
 2018 Thai-Denmark Super League -  Bronze medal, with Nakhon Ratchasima
 2018–19 Thailand League -  Champion, with Nakhon Ratchasima

References

External links
 Profile at FIVB.org

1988 births
Living people
Krittkanan Phansamdaeng
Place of birth missing (living people)
Krittkanan Phansamdaeng
Krittkanan Phansamdaeng
Krittkanan Phansamdaeng